Runaway breakdown is a theory of lightning initiation proposed by Alex Gurevich in 1992.

Electrons in air have a mean free path of ~1 cm.  Fast electrons which move at a large fraction of the speed of light have a mean free path up to 100 times longer.  Given the long free paths, an electric field can accelerate these electrons to energies far higher than that of initially static electrons.  If they strike air molecules, more relativistic electrons will be released, creating an avalanche multiplication of "runaway" electrons.  This process,  relativistic runaway electron avalanche, has been hypothesized to lead to electrical breakdown in thunderstorms, but only when a source of high-energy electrons from a cosmic ray is present to start the "runaway" process.

The resulting conductive plasma trail, many tens of meters long, is suggested to supply the "seed" which triggers a lightning flash.

See also
 List of plasma (physics) articles
 Spark gap
 Avalanche breakdown
 Electron avalanche

References

External links 
How cosmic rays trigger lightning strikes
Runaway Breakdown and the Mysteries of Lightning - Physics Today May 2005  Also available on-line at:  http://www.phy.olemiss.edu/~jgladden/phys510/spring06/Gurevich.pdf  .
Nova Science Now segment on Lightning - Aired on PBS October 18, 2005

Lightning